The Yokkaichi Challenger is a professional tennis tournament played on hard courts. It is currently part of the ATP Challenger Tour. It is held annually in Yokkaichi, Japan since 2019.

Past finals

Singles

Doubles

References

ATP Challenger Tour
Hard court tennis tournaments
Tennis tournaments in Japan
Recurring sporting events established in 2019